Nicholls is a city in Coffee County, Georgia, United States. The population was 2,798 as of the 2010 census, up from 1,008 in 2000, due to counting of the Coffee County Correctional Facility population within the city limits. This facility is privately owned and operated by CoreCivic.

The estimated city population as of 2018 was 3,338.

History
Nicholls was founded in 1895. The city was named for John C. Nicholls, a U.S. Representative from Georgia.

Geography
Nicholls is located near the eastern border of Coffee County at  (31.516941, -82.637654). Georgia State Route 32 passes through the community, leading west  to Douglas, the county seat, and east  to Alma.

Nicholls, Georgia is in the Wiregrass Region of the United States and inherits its topography and ecological diversity.

Demographics

As of the census of 2000, there were 1,008 people, 406 households, and 278 families residing in the city. The racial makeup of the city was 55.36% White, 43.55% African American, 0.40% Native American, 0.10% Asian, 0.50% from other races, and 0.10% from two or more races. Hispanic or Latino of any race were 1.19% of the population.

There were 406 households, out of which 31.0% had children under the age of 18 living with them, 42.4% were married couples living together, 21.7% had a female householder with no husband present, and 31.3% were non-families. 28.1% of all households were made up of individuals, and 15.5% had someone living alone who was 65 years of age or older.  The average household size was 2.48 and the average family size was 3.02.

In the city, the population was spread out, with 28.5% under the age of 18, 9.6% from 18 to 24, 26.7% from 25 to 44, 21.9% from 45 to 64, and 13.3% who were 65 years of age or older.  The median age was 35 years. For every 100 females, there were 85.6 males.  For every 100 females age 18 and over, there were 81.6 males.

The median income for a household in the city was $21,750, and the median income for a family was $24,479. Males had a median income of $23,990 versus $18,750 for females. The per capita income for the city was $10,592.  About 24.5% of families and 30.0% of the population were below the poverty line, including 37.7% of those under age 18 and 33.9% of those age 65 or over.

Arena
The Wiregrass Arena is located in Nicholls. It is the home of many agricultural events as well as Nicholls Founders Day, an annual festival.

References

Cities in Georgia (U.S. state)
Cities in Coffee County, Georgia